Achacachi  Municipality is one of six municipalities of the Omasuyos Province in the La Paz Department in Bolivia. Its seat is Achacachi.

The municipality is situated in the northern Altiplano of the Bolivian Andes region on the eastern shore of Lake Titicaca bordered to the north by the Larecaja Province, to the east by the Los Andes Province, to the south-east by the Huarina Municipality, to the west by the Santiago de Huata Municipality, to the south by the Huatajata Municipality and Chúa Cocani Municipality (these four municipalities were cantons of the Achacachi Municipality until 2005, 2009, and 2010, respectively), to the south-west by Lake Wiñaymarka and the northern part of Lake Titicaca, and to the north-west by the Ancoraimes Municipality.

Population 
The people are predominantly indigenous citizens of Aymara descent (95.04%).

See also 
 Janq'u K'ark'a
 Q'ara Qullu
 Wari Qalluni Pata

References 

 www.ine.gov.bo / census 2001: Achacachi  Municipality

External links 
 Achacachi Municipality: population data and map (still showing Huarina, Santiago de Huata, Huatajata, and Chúa Cocani as cantons)

Municipalities of La Paz Department (Bolivia)